Sinclair Island is part of the Great Barrier Reef Marine Park and one of the southern island in the Cole Islands group and National Park and is about 100 km south-east of Cape Melville, Queensland.

Sinclair Island is a vegetated sand cay located 15 km from the coast, well established with coconut palms and sisal that provide a habitat for a number of roosting birds and green turtles and hawksbill turtles.

This island is used by a number of tour operators.

Islands on the Great Barrier Reef